Sipsmith is a microdistillery located in London. It is the first copper-pot distillery to open within Greater London' in nearly two centuries. It has been a subsidiary of Beam Suntory since December 2016.

The Sipsmith Gin distillery is one of 24 in London, the others are: Beefeater Gin, Sacred Microdistillery, The London Distillery Company, Doghouse Distillery, Old Bakery Gin, Bimber Distillery, Boxer Gin, Graveney Gin, 58 and Co, Four Thieves, Thames Distillers, Half Hitch Gin, Highwayman Gin, East London Liquor Company, City of London Distillery, Bermondsey Distillery (Jensens Gin), Bump Caves Distillery (The Draft House), Kingston Distillers (Beckett's Gin), Portobello Road Gin, Butler's Gin, Little Bird Gin, and Hayman's.

History 
Sipsmith was established in London in 2009. The first copper-pot based distillery to start up in London in 189 years, it is one of only four gin distilleries located in London. The Beefeater Gin Distillery (established by the John Burrough's Company in 1863), Thames Distillers, Sacred Microdistillery, The London Distillery Company and Sipsmith are the only remaining licensed distilleries in the nation's capital.
Sipsmith was launched by Sam Galsworthy and Fairfax Hall, respectively former Fuller's and Diageo employees and Jared Brown, who is also Sipsmith's Master Distiller. A drinks and spirits historian and publisher, he has developed spirits in Sweden, Norway, Vietnam, and in the US over the past 12 years.

The Sipsmith still was designed and produced by the German still manufacturers Christian Carl. Prudence is the subject of their iconic swan neck copper still labelling, created alongside their visual identity and brand by Perry Haydn Taylor's agency, big fish, before Sipsmith was started.
On 16 December 2016 it was announced that Beam Suntory had taken a controlling stake in Sipsmith for an undisclosed sum, but that Sam Galsworthy, Fairfax Hall and Jared Brown would be staying on to lead the distillery.

In December 2016, Sipsmith was acquired by Japanese Beam Suntory, a subsidiary of Suntory Beverage & Food Ltd, for £50 million.

In May 2017, Sipsmith partnered with the secret London culinary boutique Gingerline to create an «immersive gin dinner».

Activities 
The Sipsmith distillery is situated on a residential street in West London on the site of a former microbrewery, later the offices of beer hunter Michael Jackson.

Sipsmith's first two spirits are a Barley Vodka and a London Dry Gin. These are produced in small batches of fewer than 300 bottles, from an English Barley mash that is created off-site. Each batch is made in a traditional manner with three cuts: the Head or foreshot is discarded; the Heart or core of the distillation run is retained; and the Tail or feints is discarded. The Heart of the distillation is diluted to its final bottling strength with Lydwell Spring water, one of the sources of the River Thames in the Cotswolds.

Products

Sipsmith London Dry Gin (41.6% ABV): A classic London dry style gin, it uses 10 botanicals in its maceration: Juniper berries, Coriander Seed, Angelica Root, Liquorice Root, Orris Root, Ground Almond, Cassia Bark, Cinnamon, Orange Peel and Lemon Peel.
Sipsmith Sipping Vodka (40% ABV): An unfiltered and unsweetened wheat vodka, the spirit derives its flavour from its essential grain base.
Sipsmith Sloe Gin (29% ABV): released in October 2010
Sipsmith London Cup (29% ABV): a type of fruit cups with Lemon Verbena, Rose petals,  Borage and Earl grey released in August 2011
Sipsmith Damson Vodka (28% ABV): released in 2010
Sipsmith VJOP (57.7% ABV): 'Very Junipery Over Proof'
Sipsmith Lemon Drizzle with fresh vapour infused Lemon peels and Lemon Verbena
Sipsmith zesty Orange distilled with Bergamot and infused with fresh Orange peel
Sipsmith Orange and Cacao is infused with Orange peel and Cocoa bean
Sipsmith Chili and Lime gin with fresh Lime and 7 Chili varieties
Sipsmith Strawberry smash distillet with mint and Strawberrys
In 2015, to commemorate the 100th anniversary of the Singapore Sling, Sipsmith partnered with Raffles Hotels & Resorts to create a brand-made gin, the Raffles 1915 Gin.

Awards 

The distillery won the 2010 Observer Food Monthly Award for Best Newcomer.

References

External links
Sipsmith - Independent Spirits
Beam Suntory

Gins
Distilleries in England
Drink companies based in London
Manufacturing companies based in London
2009 establishments in England
British companies established in 2009
Beam Suntory
Microdistilleries
Food and drink companies established in 2009